Hystrignathidae is a family of nematodes belonging to the order Rhabditida.

Genera:
 Anomalostoma Cordeira, 1981
 Anuronema Clark, 1978
 Artigasia Christie, 1934
 Basirella Biswas & Chakravarty, 1963
 Batwanema Morffe & García, 2013
 Boraceianema Travassos & Kloss, 1958
 Buzionema Kloss, 1966
 Carlosia Travassos & Kloss, 1957
 Chokwenema Morffe & García, 2013
 Christiella Travassos & Kloss, 1957
 Coronocephalus Cordeira, 1981
 Coynema Morffe & García, 2011
 Glaber Travassos & Kloss, 1958
 Hystrignathus Leidy, 1850
 Hystrignatus
 Jibacoa Coy-Otero, Garcia & Alvarez, 1993
 Klossiella Cordeira, 1981
 Klossnema Cordeira, 1981
 Kongonema Morffe & García, 2013
 Lauronema Almeida, 1938
 Lepidonema Cobb, 1898
 Longior Travassos & Kloss, 1958
 Lubanema Morffe & García, 2013
 Mentecle Travassos & Kloss, 1958
 Papillabrum Kloss, 1962
 Passalidophila Van Waerebeke, 1973
 Phalacronema Clark, 1978
 Salesia Travassos & Kloss, 1958
 Soaresnema Travassos & Kloss, 1958
 Sprentia Clark, 1978
 Triumphalisnema Kloss, 1962
 Urbanonema Travassos & Kloss, 1958
 Ventelia Travassos & Kloss, 1958
 Vulcanonema Travassos & Kloss, 1958

References

Nematodes